Karnei Shomron (lit. "Rays (of light) of Samaria") is an Israeli settlement organized as a local council established in 1977 in the West Bank, east of Kfar Saba.

The international community considers Israeli settlements in the West Bank illegal under international law, but the Israeli government disputes this.

History
According to ARIJ, Israel confiscated land from four nearby Palestinian villages of in order to construct Karnei Shomron:

713 dunams from Jinsafut,
512 dunams from Deir Istiya,
 229 dunams from Kafr Laqif,
216 dunams from Hajjah.

In 1991, several Israeli settlements were merged to become a single municipality called Karnei Shomron Local Council:
Karnei Shomron - established in 1977,  450 families
Ginot Shomron - established in 1984,  850 families
Neve Menachem/Neve Oramin  - established in 1991,  220 families
Alonei Shilo - established in 1999,   25 families

The town borders Wadi Qana, a wadi marking the border between lands that are believed to have been the territory of the tribes of Efraim and Menashe in biblical times. The Nahal Kana Wadi is administered by the Israel Nature and Parks Authority and is defined as a Nature Reserve.

Mitzpe Tzvaim; Midreshet Shilat, a midrasha for girls; and Ramat Gil'ad are also part of Karnei Shomron. Neve Aliza is a religious neighborhood of American-style homes founded by new immigrants from the United States and Canada in 1985.

The chief rabbi of Karnei Shomron is Yitzhak HaLevy. Igal Lahav is the head of the Karnei Shomron Local Council.

During the second intifada, on 16 February 2002, two people were killed and 30 people were wounded, six seriously, when a suicide bomber blew himself up at a pizzeria in the Karnei Shomron (located in Ginot Shomron) shopping mall. Rachel Thaler, 16 died of her wounds on 27 February. The Popular Front for the Liberation of Palestine claimed responsibility for the attack.

Notable residents
Michael Ben-Ari
Moshe Feiglin
Shmuel Sackett

See also
Kafr Laqif
Karnei Shomron Mall suicide bombing

References

External links
Karnei Shomron website

Israeli settlements in the West Bank
Mixed Israeli settlements
Populated places established in 1977
1977 establishments in the Israeli Military Governorate